Friedrich Air Conditioning is an American privately held company that manufactures commercial-grade room air conditioners and specialty cooling products for residential and light commercial applications. The company is based in Uptown, San Antonio, Texas.

History
The company was founded in 1883 by Ed Friedrich as a manufacturer of handcrafted furniture and other goods such as billiards tables, store fixtures, and other cabinetry. He later turned towards refrigeration and developed products to enhance food preservation.

After initially focusing on optimizing ice as a coolant, Friedrich looked towards mechanical refrigeration.

By 1950, the company was a large manufacturer of commercial refrigeration equipment. It entered the relatively new field of air conditioning in 1952 with its first window air conditioning units.  The company is credited with several innovations, including introducing the first refrigerated display case for food retailers.

In 1971, the company moved its headquarters to the Pan Am Expressway on San Antonio's Near East Side, once part of Fort Sam Houston. In 2008, the company moved the bulk of its production to Monterrey, Mexico. In 2010, the company moved its headquarters again to a building in Uptown San Antonio, to the immediate west of the city's airport. The company was acquired by Corinthian Capital in December, 2012. It was then acquired by Monomoy Capital Partners, and once again acquired by Rheem in 2021.

Friedrich is now focused on manufacturing room air conditioners.  Their products include window, thru-the-wall, portable and ductless air conditioners, as well as dehumidifiers.

Friedrich Deluxe/CP series window air conditioner units were previously produced by Panasonic, and later LG. These units were historically known for their extremely quiet operation and that tradition carried on with the Friedrich branded units with "CP" model numbers. They were made in the same factory and maintained the same overall engineering as the earlier Panasonic/LG units.

In 2012, the company introduced the entry-level Chill and Uni-Fit lines of room air conditioners manufactured by LG and produced in China as replacements for the Deluxe/CP line. The Chill and Uni-Fit are low-cost alternatives to the Kühl and WallMaster series. Both of these lines were both re-designed to include Wi-Fi capability, heating capability (on select versions), and QuietMaster technology in 2021 and 2019, respectively; with the Chill line now being called the Chill Premier.

Notable products
 1972 SM10310 model, 10,300 BTU/h, 115V 60 Hz, 7 amps, 860W, and EER of 12.0. It is the most high-efficiency room air conditioner made by Friedrich.
 QuietMaster Series: Professional grade room air conditioners manufactured from the 1970s until 2010, when it was replaced by the S/M/L chassis Kühl models. They were manufactured in standard (3-speed analog), "Deluxe" (Deluxe was later called 4-Speed), and "Programmable" (digital) configurations.
 Hazardgard: Speciality cooling air conditioners manufactured for use in severe duty applications such as manufacturing facilities, processing plants, or where hazardous materials are present. They are built to operate in extreme cold and extreme heat, have advanced corrosion protection, permanent split capacitors, environmentally sealed controls, and a host of other heavy duty features.
 QStar (portable window and thru-the-wall room air conditioner with slide-out chassis), introduced in 1990 and produced until 2012. The QStar had other variations, such as KStar, XStar and TwinTemp. The QStar was replaced by the "Q" chassis Kühl models in 2012.
 TwinTemp: Built in both "QuietMaster" and QStar configurations, these units provided both heating and cooling settings in one unit. They were replaced in 2010 by the Kuhl + models.

References
Notes

General references

The Friedrich Story. (company website)
The Ed Friedrich Story, Lesson In Integrity.  The Miami News - December 2, 1963
Industry Today - Friedrich Air Conditioning Co. - Cool It.  Industry Today, Vol 3, Issue 9
Capstone Partners Advises Friedrich Air Conditioning Co. in its Sale to Corinthian Capital.
Friedrich Air Conditioning Co.  Hotel & Motel Management, August 14, 2000

External links

Manufacturing companies established in 1883
Manufacturing companies based in San Antonio
Cooling technology
Heating, ventilation, and air conditioning companies